Denys Stoyan (born 24 August 1981) is a retired Ukrainian football defender who last played for Ukrainian Premier League club FC Poltava.

Stoyan was on a scorelist at the 2001 FIFA World Youth Championship for Ukraine.

See also
 2001 FIFA World Youth Championship squads#Ukraine

External links 
Profile on Official Tavriya website 

1981 births
Living people
People from Hrebinky
Ukrainian footballers
Ukraine youth international footballers
Ukrainian Premier League players
FC Desna Chernihiv players
FC Chornomorets Odesa players
SC Tavriya Simferopol players
FC Vorskla Poltava players
FC Zirka Kropyvnytskyi players
FC Kaisar players
FC Yednist Plysky players
Ukrainian expatriate footballers
Expatriate footballers in Kazakhstan
Association football defenders
Ukrainian people of Armenian descent
Sportspeople from Kyiv Oblast